The anal canal is the part that connects the rectum to the anus, located below the level of the pelvic diaphragm. It is located within the anal triangle of the perineum, between the right and left ischioanal fossa. As the final functional segment of the bowel, it functions to regulate release of excrement by two muscular sphincter complexes. The anus is the aperture at the terminal portion of the anal canal.

Structure
It is directed downwards and backwards. It is surrounded by inner involuntary and outer voluntary sphincters which keep the lumen closed in the form of an anteroposterior slit.

The canal is differentiated from the rectum by a transition along the internal surface from endodermal to skin-like  ectodermal tissue.

The anal canal is traditionally divided into two segments, upper and lower, separated by the pectinate line (also known as the dentate line):

 upper zone (zona columnaris) 
 mucosa is lined by simple columnar epithelium 
 features longitudinal folds or elevations of tunica mucosa which are joined inferiorly by folds of mucous membrane known as anal valves
 supplied by the superior rectal artery (a branch of the inferior mesenteric artery) 
 lower zone  
 divided into two smaller zones, separated by a white line known as the Hilton's line: 
 zona hemorrhagica - lined by stratified squamous non-keratinized epithelium
 zona cutanea - lined stratified squamous keratinized epithelium, which blends with the surrounding perianal skin 
 supplied by the inferior rectal artery (a branch of the internal pudendal artery)

The anal verge refers to the distal end of the anal canal, a transitional zone between the epithelium of the anal canal and the perianal skin. It should not be confused with the pectinate line between the upper and lower zones within the anal canal.

The Anal gland secretes lymphal discharge and built-up fecal matter from the colon lining. In some animals this gland expungement can be done routinely every 24–36 months to prevent infection and fistula formation.

Relations
The ischioanal fossa are on each side of the anal canal.
The perianal space surrounds the anal canal below the white line.
The submucous space of the canal lies above the white line between the mucous membrane and internal anal sphincter muscle.

Function
The external anal sphincter muscle is the voluntary muscle that surrounds and adheres to the anus at the lower margin of the anal canal. This muscle is in a state of tonic contraction, but during defecation, it relaxes to allow the release of feces.

Movement of the feces is also controlled by the involuntarily controlled internal anal sphincter, which is an extension of the circular muscle surrounding the anal canal. It relaxes to expel feces from the rectum and anal canal.

Additional images

See also

 Anal columns
 Anal sinuses
 Anal sex

References

External links
 
  — "The rectum and anal canal in the male pelvis"

Digestive system
Canal